Paremhat 6 - Coptic Calendar - Paremhat 8

The seventh day of the Coptic month of Paremhat, the seventh month of the Coptic year. In common years, this day corresponds to March 3, of the Julian Calendar, and March 16, of the Gregorian Calendar. This day falls in the Coptic Season of Shemu, the season of the Harvest.

Commemorations

Martyrs 

 The martyrdom of Saints Philemon and Apollonius
 The martyrdom of Saint Mary the Israelite

References 

Days of the Coptic calendar